Griselda Siciliani (born 2 April 1978) is an Argentine actress, singer and dancer.

Biography
Griselda Siciliani began her career in musical comedy, and took part in the theater play "Revista Nacional". She met American-born actor and producer Adrián Suar, who took her to play a secretary in Sin Código, a satirical police sitcom where Suar was the main actor. Her character was named "Flor", a nerd that fell in love with her boss, who did not even notice. Griselda won the Clarín Award and Martín Fierro Award as best female revelation for this role. She posed for the Argentine edition of Playboy magazine, but she was not satisfied with the production.

She worked the following year in the Sos mi vida telenovela, and in the musical Sweet Charity. Debbie, her character in Sos mi vida, a shallow woman with many clichés, became more popular than her previous one. During that program she became friends with fellow actress Carla Peterson, and although they did not work together again in the same TV production, they arranged a joint theater play in 2009, "Corazón Idiota".

Her first leading role was in 2007, in the teen drama Patito Feo. Her character "Carmen" was the mother of the main character, and the main adult character. The telenovela included musicals and an international tour by the end of the year, so she also had to sing and dance. The success of Patito Feo allowed for a second season in 2008. Siciliani had a relationship with Adrian Suar from 2008 to 2016. They have a daughter, born in 2013.

She worked in Para vestir santos, and later at the superhero live-action television series Los únicos. Siciliani is the main actress, along with Mariano Martínez and Nicolás Cabré. Although Nicolás Cabré plays his former character of "Axel Etcheverry" from the Sin Código 2005 telenovela, the character of Siciliani is unrelated to her former character of "Flor". This time, she plays "María Soledad Marini", a stealth agent with superhuman strength.

Works

Films

TV

Theater plays
 Corazón Idiota
 La Forma de Las Cosas
 Sweet Charity
 Quiero Llenarme de Ti
 El Rebenque Show
 La Revista Nacional
 Los Reyes
 Tan Modositas
 Hermosura
 De Protesta
 La Danza Cansa
 Los Muvis
 La Vuelta Manzana
 Sputza
 Sugar

Awards
 2013 Martín Fierro Awards: Best actress of daily drama (for Farsantes)

References

External links

 

1978 births
Living people
Actresses from Buenos Aires
Argentine film actresses
Argentine telenovela actresses
Argentine television actresses
Argentine stage actresses
Argentine people of Italian descent
Participants in Argentine reality television series
Bailando por un Sueño (Argentine TV series) participants
20th-century Argentine actresses
21st-century Argentine actresses